Rai Gr Parlamento is an Italian radio channel devoted to live coverage of proceedings in the Italian Parliament (Chamber of Deputies and Senate), the Presidency of the Italian Republic, the European Parliament, and Regional and some Communal Councils. It was launched in 1998 by RAI and the Italian Ministry of Communications.

Transmissions are on FM, DAB, Hot Bird frequencies, and via RealMedia live audio streaming.

When there is no political or info programming, from 21:00 till 07:00 hrs, Rai GR Parlamento delays Rai Radio Tutto Italiana with Italian music.

Scheduling
 Sinai, (religion) hosted by Pier Luigi Gregori and Gianpietro Olivetto
 Radio 7, hosted by Aldo Papa
 Pop Politics, (entertainment) hosted by Angelo Mellone
 Pagine in frequenza, (books) hosted by Alessandro Forlani
 Le Regole del Gusto, (cooking) hosted by Gerardo Antelmo
 La Politica nel Pallone, (soccer) hosted by Emilio Mancuso
 L'altro Sport, (sports) hosted by Roberto Imbastaro
 In nome della Legge, (laws) hosted by Gianfranco D'Anna
 Il Parlamento e le Arti, (arts) hosted by Roberta Ammendola
 Economia in Aula, (economics) hosted by Paolo Corsini
 Clima, (ecology) hosted by Gaetano Giordano
 Articolo 32, (health) hosted by Gerardo D'Amico
 Agorà, hosted by Anna Notariello

Logos

See also
RAI
Camera dei Deputati (TV channel)
Senato Italiano (TV channel)

External links
 Rai Gr Parlamento on rai.it 
 Rai Gr Parlamento on rai.tv 

Free-to-air
Legislature broadcasters
Mass media in Rome
Radio stations in Italy
RAI radio stations
Radio stations established in 1998
News and talk radio stations